Orlando Health is a private, not-for-profit network of community and specialty hospitals based in Orlando, Florida. Orlando Health is Central Florida’s fourth largest employer with nearly 23,000 employees and more than 4,500 affiliated physicians.

History
The system was founded in 1918 when the first hospital, Orange General Hospital, was opened. In 1946, the hospital name changed to Orange Memorial Hospital. In 1951, Orange Memorial became approved as a teaching hospital, one of the first in Florida.

In 1977, Orange Memorial and Holiday hospitals consolidated to form the new Orlando Regional Medical Center, in 1984 the Air Care Team was formed providing scene and interfacility air transport to the Central Florida area, and in 1985 Sand Lake Hospital was built. The Arnold Palmer Hospital for Children & Women opened in 1989 and in 1991 M. D. Anderson Cancer Center Orlando was created.

In 1992, ORMC changed its corporate name to Orlando Regional Healthcare System to reflect the growing network of facilities. That same year, ORHS began co-owning South Seminole Hospital with Healthtrust. In 1997, ORHS purchased a 49% share in Leesburg Regional Medical Center.

In 1999, ORHS purchased Lucerne Hospital. The following year, ORHS dropped the word "System" from its name, keeping Orlando Regional Healthcare as the corporate name. In 2005, the Winnie Palmer Hospital for Women & Babies was built.

In 2008, the system was rebranded to change the corporate name of the organization from Orlando Regional Healthcare to Orlando Health.

On October 1, 2020, Bayfront Health St. Petersburg joined Orlando Health Inc. Orlando Health officially closed on the hospital purchase from Community Health Systems (CHS) on Wednesday, September 30.

Demographics
Orlando Health serves 1.6 million Central Florida residents and several thousand international patients annually.  Orlando Health is considered a disproportionate share hospital, meaning it receives special funding because it treats significant populations of indigent patients. Orlando Health is also Central Florida's only qualified participant in the Safety Net Hospital Alliance of Florida (SNHAF). The 14 hospital systems that make up the SNHAF include the state's teaching hospitals, public hospitals and trauma centers. These organizations account for less than 10 percent of the hospitals in Florida, but provide more than 50% of the state's charity care.

Facilities
The core campus of Orlando Health is located just south of downtown Orlando. Orlando Health Orlando Regional Medical Center, Orlando Health Arnold Palmer Hospital for Children, Orlando Health Winnie Palmer Hospital for Women & Babies, and Orlando Health UF Health Cancer Center are grouped together on the main campus of Orlando Health.

Orlando Health | Orlando Regional Medical Center
Orlando Health | Arnold Palmer Hospital for Children
Orlando Health | Winnie Palmer Hospital for Women & Babies
Orlando Health | Horizon West Hospital in Winter Garden
Orlando Health | Cancer Institute
Orlando Health | Dr. P. Phillips Hospital, a medical and surgical facility in Dr. Phillips
Orlando Health | South Seminole Hospital, medical/surgical community hospital in Longwood
Orlando Health | Health Central Hospital in Ocoee
Orlando Health | South Lake Hospital in Clermont
Orlando Health | St. Cloud Hospital
Bayfront Health | St. Petersburg

Sports sponsorship 
In  2013, Orlando Health became the first sponsor for the MLS expansion club Orlando City SC. Their sponsorship was a carry-over partnership that was established when Orlando City SC was part of the United Soccer League Pro Division.

Pediatric Associates of Orlando 
On Tuesday, Sept 1, 2015, Orlando Health acquired Pediatric Associates of Orlando. The pediatric group founded in 1939 has ten board-certified pediatricians and two locations, one in Orlando and one in Ocoee.

References

External links
 
 UF Health Cancer Center - Orlando Health Official website
 Arnold Palmer Hospital for Children Official website
 Winnie Palmer Hospital for Women and Babies Official website

Organizations based in Orlando, Florida
Hospital networks in the United States
Healthcare in Orlando, Florida
1918 establishments in Florida
Medical and health organizations based in Florida